Judit Csabai (née Rácz; born 24 March 1947) is a Hungarian politician, a former member of the National Assembly between 1994–95 and 1998–2006. She represented Nyíregyháza (Szabolcs-Szatmár-Bereg County Constituency II) from 2002-06. Csabai served as Mayor of Nyíregyháza between 1994 and 2010. She was succeeded by Ferenc Kovács.

Her daughter, Judit, is a former freestyle swimmer, who competed at the Summer Olympics for her native country in 1988.

References

1947 births
Living people
Hungarian jurists
Members of the Hungarian Socialist Workers' Party
Hungarian Socialist Party politicians
Members of the National Assembly of Hungary (1994–1998)
Members of the National Assembly of Hungary (1998–2002)
Members of the National Assembly of Hungary (2002–2006)
Mayors of places in Hungary
Politicians from Budapest
20th-century Hungarian women politicians
21st-century Hungarian women politicians